Aitareya may refer to:

Aitareya Brahmana, a Vedic shakha
Aitareya Upanishad
Aitareya Aranyaka